Hifumi Suzuki (鈴木 十二美, Suzuki Hifumi, born 18 December 1957) is a Japanese Paralympic archer who competed at four different games and gained several medals.

Life
Suzuki was born in 1957. She shoots with a recurve bow in the Paralympic W2 class for paraplegics. She first competed at the 1984 Summer Paralympics. She also went to the paralympics in 1992 and 1996. At the 1996 Paralympics in Atlanta, she won an individual gold medal as well as a silver medal in the women's team open event alongside Shigeko Matsueda and Masako Yonezawa. She also competed in 2000 where she won a bronze medal women's teams open event alongside Naomi Isozaki and Masako Yonezawa.

References

External links 
 

1957 births
Living people
Japanese female archers
Paralympic archers of Japan
Paralympic gold medalists for Japan
Paralympic silver medalists for Japan
Paralympic bronze medalists for Japan
Paralympic medalists in archery
Archers at the 1984 Summer Paralympics
Archers at the 1992 Summer Paralympics
Archers at the 1996 Summer Paralympics
Archers at the 2000 Summer Paralympics
Medalists at the 1984 Summer Paralympics
Medalists at the 1992 Summer Paralympics
Medalists at the 1996 Summer Paralympics
Medalists at the 2000 Summer Paralympics
20th-century Japanese women
21st-century Japanese women